The Secret of the Desert (Danish:Sfinxenx Hemmelighed) is a 1918 Danish silent film directed by Robert Dinesen.

The film's sets were designed by Carlo Jacobsen

Cast
 Alma Hinding as Annie  
 Thorleif Lund as Mr. Lawson  
 Axel Mattson 
 Valdemar Psilander as Mr. Hunter  
 Franz Skondrup 
 Agis Winding as Lady Trenton

References

Bibliography
 Jennifer M. Bean, Laura Horak & Anupama Kapse. Silent Cinema and the Politics of Space. Indiana University Press, 2014.

External links
 

1918 films
Danish-language films
Danish silent films
Films directed by Robert Dinesen
Danish black-and-white films